FabricLive.68 is a 2013 DJ mix album by Calibre. The album was released as part of the FabricLive Mix Series.

Track list

References

External links
 FabricLive.68 at Fabric
 FabricLive.68 at Allmusic

Fabric (club) albums
2013 compilation albums